Doreen Mary Carwithen (15 November 19225 January 2003) was a British composer of classical and film music. She was also known as Mary Alwyn following her marriage to William Alwyn.

Biography
Doreen Carwithen was born at 8 High Street, Haddenham, Buckinghamshire on 15 November 1922, in the house attached to her father's bakery and grocery. As a child she had her first music lessons from her mother Dulcie, an aspiring concert pianist and pupil of Tobias Matthay who gave up her wider ambitions to become a music teacher after her marriage in 1921. Doreen studied both piano and violin with her from the age of four. Her sister Barbara Carwithen (born 1926) received similar tuition and also became a talented musician and composer.

At the age of 16 Doreen Carwithen began composing by setting Wordsworth's "I Wandered Lonely as a Cloud" for voice and piano. In 1941 she entered the Royal Academy of Music and played the cello in a string quartet and with orchestras. She was a member of the harmony class of William Alwyn, who began to teach her composition. Her first orchestral work, the overture ODTAA (One Damn Thing After Another), was premiered at Covent Garden by the London Philharmonic Orchestra, conducted by Adrian Boult on 2 March 1947. The previous year she had become the first recipient of a J. Arthur Rank Film Scholarship.

In 1961 she became William Alwyn's devoted secretary and amanuensis, becoming his second wife in 1975, adopting Mary Alwyn as her married name, as she disliked the name Doreen, and Mary was her middle name. She later worked as a Sub Professor of Composition at the RAM. After her husband's death in 1985, she founded the William Alwyn Archive and William Alwyn Foundation to promote his music and facilitate related research projects.

She then also resumed interest in her own music. In 1999, a stroke left her paralysed on one side. She died at Forncett St Peter, near Norwich, on 5 January 2003.

Works
Doreen Carwithen wrote scores for over 30 films, including Harvest from the Wilderness (1948), Boys in Brown (1950), Mantrap (released in the U.S. as Man in Hiding) (1952), The Men of Sherwood Forest (1954) and Three Cases of Murder (1955). Music from the score of the short British Transport Films documentary East Anglian Holiday (1954)  was later reused in her Suffolk Suite. She gained a reputation in the film industry for her professionalism and speed under pressure: her score for Elizabeth Is Queen, the official film of the coronation of Queen Elizabeth II, had to be completed in just three days.

Her orchestral works include an overture ODTAA (One Damn Thing After Another) (1945) (after the novel by John Masefield); a Concerto for piano and strings (1948); the overture Bishop Rock (1952) and the Suffolk Suite (1964). Scores and parts for Bishop Rock and Suffolk Suite are available from Goodmusic. She also wrote a Violin Sonata (1951) and two award-winning (Clements Prize, 1948 and Cobbett Award, 1952) but little-known string quartets, which received their first recordings in 1998, as well as seven solo songs, composed early in her career.

Carwithen was an accomplished pianist herself, as is evident from the piano writing in her 1948 Piano Concerto. But her neo-classical three movement Sonatina (1946) was written for her lifelong friend, the pianist Violet Graham Cole (1923-2000). She also edited for performance the second piano concerto by her husband William Alwyn.

A Doreen Carwithen Music Festival took place in the village of Haddenham between 30 June and 3 July 2022, marking her centenary. For the same reason, the BBC Proms included three of her works - Bishop Rock, the Second String Quartet and ODTAA - in the 2022 season, and her life and work were featured in the BBC Radio Three series Composer of the Week in November 2022.

Selected filmography
 Harvest from the Wilderness (1948)
 To the Public Danger (1948)
 Boys in Brown (1950)
 The Stranger Left No Card (1952)
 Elizabeth is Queen (1953)
 Mantrap (1953) (U.S. as Man in Hiding)
 East Anglian Holiday (1954)
 The Men of Sherwood Forest (1954)
 Break in the Circle (1955)
 On The Twelfth Day... (1955) (directed by Wendy Toye)
 Three Cases of Murder (1955)

References

Further reading
Leah Broad, Quartet (Faber & Faber, 2023)

External links

Carwithen biography on Musicweb
Obituary of Doreen Carwithen by Martin Anderson
 East Anglian Holiday, British Transport Films
 Carwithen Music Festival
 Sonatina, played by Clare Hammond at  the Aldeburgh Festival, June 2022

1922 births
2003 deaths
20th-century classical composers
Alumni of the Royal Academy of Music
English film score composers
Women film score composers
People from Aylesbury Vale
British women classical composers
20th-century English composers
Amanuenses
20th-century English women musicians
Musicians from Buckinghamshire
20th-century women composers
People from Forncett